Punta San Pedro Airstrip or Bahía Concepción Airstrip  is a dirt airstrip in Municipality of Mulegé, Baja California Sur state, Mexico.

The airstrip is used solely for general aviation  purposes.

See also

Airports in Baja California Sur
Mulegé Municipality